Admiral Sir Thomas Pakenham GCB (29 September 1757 – 2 February 1836), styled The Honourable from birth to 1820, was a British naval officer and politician.

Biography
Pakenham was born the fourth son of The 1st Baron Longford and his wife Elizabeth, Baroness Longford (she was later created, in June 1785, The 1st Countess of Longford).

In the following year he was promoted by Lord Shuldham to be lieutenant of the frigate , and while in her saw much boat service, in the course of which he was severely wounded.

In the following spring he was moved into the Europe, going to North America with the flag of Rear-Admiral Mariot Arbuthnot, and on 21 September 1779 was promoted to the command of the sloop , newly captured from the enemy. His old wound, received while in the Greyhound, broke out again, and compelled him to return to England in the autumn.

On their way back, in passing through the straits, they fell in, on 30 May, with two Dutch frigates. In the ensuing Battle of Cape St Mary, one of the Dutch frigates, the Castor (commanded by Pieter Melvill van Carnbee), struck to the Flora, while the other, the Den Briel, overpowered and captured the Crescent. The Crescent was immediately recaptured by the Flora, the Den Briel making her escape; but both Crescent and Castor had received so much damage in the action that they fell into the hands of two French frigates on the way home, 19 June, the Flora escaping. Pakenham had, however, refused to resume the command of the Crescent, maintaining that by his surrender to the Den Briel his commission was cancelled, and that when recaptured the ship was on the same footing as any other prize.

For the loss of his ship he was tried by court-martial and honourably acquitted, it being proved that he did not strike the flag till, by the fall of her masts and the disabling of her guns, further resistance was impossible. He was therefore at once appointed to the frigate , which he commanded in the following year at the relief of Gibraltar by Lord Howe.

In 1795 he was turned over to the 84-gun ship Juste, in the capture of which, on 1 June, he had had a principal hand. He was afterwards for some time master-general of the ordnance in Ireland, and had no further service in the navy.

In 1783, Pakenham entered the Irish House of Commons for Longford Borough and sat until 1790. Subsequently, he represented Kells until 1798 and again Longford Borough until the Act of Union in 1801.

On 14 February 1799, Pakenham was promoted to be rear-admiral, vice-admiral on 23 April 1804, and admiral on 31 July 1810. He was appointed a Knight Grand Cross of the Order of the Bath on 20 May 1820.

He married in 1785 Louisa, daughter of the Right Hon. John Staples, and had a large family. His fifth son Sir Richard Pakenham was a diplomat who served as British ambassador to Mexico, the United States and Portugal. Pakenham died on 2 February 1836.

References

 

1757 births
1836 deaths
Royal Navy personnel of the American Revolutionary War
Royal Navy personnel of the French Revolutionary Wars
Irish MPs 1783–1790
Irish MPs 1790–1797
Irish MPs 1798–1800
Knights Grand Cross of the Order of the Bath
Royal Navy admirals
Younger sons of earls
Younger sons of barons
Thomas
Members of the Parliament of Ireland (pre-1801) for County Longford constituencies
Members of the Parliament of Ireland (pre-1801) for County Meath constituencies
Royal Navy personnel of the Fourth Anglo-Dutch War